"My Name Is Not Susan" is a song by American singer and actress Whitney Houston, released as the fourth single from her third album, I'm Your Baby Tonight (1990). The song was released on June 24, 1991, by Arista Records. It was produced by L.A. Reid and Babyface, and written by Eric Foster White. The song is an uptempo new jack swing number in which Houston harshly tells off a lover who has mistakenly called her by his ex-girlfriend's name "Susan". She lets him know that if he cannot get over Susan, then their relationship is over. A remix featuring British rapper Monie Love was also released, becoming one of the first times a pop/R&B artist had included a rapper in a remix, following Janet Jackson's "Alright", which remix featured Heavy D the year previous.

Critical reception 

In an retrospective review, Matthew Hocter from Albumism noted the "fresh vibe", describing the song as "thumping". Upon the release, J.D. Considine of The Baltimore Sun felt it was "emotionless", adding, "(Whitney) has no trouble navigating a state-of-the-art funk groove (as with the new jack "My Name Is Not Susan"), she's mainly going through the motions; there's absolutely nothing in her performance to suggest that she was even the slightest bit moved by these songs." Larry Flick from Billboard commented, "After several ballads, Houston jacks it up on a percolating jam that features one of her more assertive vocals." Henderson and DeVaney from Cashbox stated, "This high-tech, funky, L.A. & Babyface-produced cut isn't nearly as pop as some of Houston's material." 

Entertainment Weekly editor David Browne panned it, writing that "in what could be seen as an audition for her pending movie career, Houston gets to act angry on My Name Is Not Susan, in which she scolds a bedmate for calling out the name of an ex-flame in his sleep." Pan-European magazine Music & Media described it as a "pacey pop/dance track boasting a snappy chorus." Rolling Stones James Hunter noted that Houston "stipulates in no uncertain terms" in this song vocally. Caroline Sullivan from Smash Hits commented, "And not only are her lyrics more adult, the music is the toughest she's come up with yet. Of course, being Whitney, that means it's still fairly sugar sweet, but this is a most enjoyable record."

 Music video 
In the song's accompanying music video directed by Lionel C. Martin, Houston is featured playing both herself and a character named "Susan". The video is inspired by several elements in the Alfred Hitchcock film Vertigo, both containing a man involved with an obsessive love for both a glamorous blonde and down-to-earth brunette played by the same actress. Several specific scenes that are parallel include a visit to a park, dining in a restaurant, and the photographer's buying clothes for the girl, having her hair also dyed blonde, and the way she emerges from the bathroom.  The boyfriend, who is a photographer may have been suggested by another Hitchcock film, Rear Window. There is also a version of the video with a remix with British rapper Monie Love. Outtakes from the video and alternate footage was reused for the video to the follow-up single "I Belong to You".

 Chart performance 
"My Name Is Not Susan" debuted on the US Billboard Hot 100 at number 67, peaking at number 20. It remained in the Top 40 for six weeks, Houston's shortest showing at the time. It peaked at number eight on the Billboard R&B Singles Chart. "My Name Is Not Susan" was modestly received internationally, where it peaked at number 29 on the UK Singles Chart and a modest number 57 in Germany. In 1998, a remixed version of the song (remixed by Snap! in 1991 as the Logic remix) charted in Germany and reached number 52, five places higher than the original did in 1991.

 Live performances 
Houston performed the song on her 1991 I'm Your Baby Tonight World Tour. Three different performances of the song were taped; in Yokohama, Japan on March 15, 1991; Oakland, California on May 11, 1991; and A Coruña, Spain on September 29, 1991. The Yokohama concert was broadcast on Japanese TV channel and the show in Oakland was aired during The Simple Truth: A Concert for Kurdish Refugees, a telethon held to aid the Kurds on May 12, 1991. She also performed the song on Welcome Home Heroes, broadcast live on HBO, March 31, 1991. This performance can be found on the video: Welcome Home Heroes with Whitney Houston ― Live in Concert. At the 19th American Music Awards of 1992, Houston performed the remixed version of the song as a part of "I'm Your Baby Tonight Medley," along with "I'm Your Baby Tonight" and "Who Do You Love." In addition, she performed the song on The Concert for a New South Africa, the first of three concerts was aired live on HBO in November 1994, and on a private gig to celebrate for the wedding of Princess Rashidah, the eldest daughter of the Sultan of Brunei on August 24, 1996.

 Track listings and formats 

 UK, CD maxi-single "My Name Is Not Susan" (Waddell 7") — 4:08 	
 "My Name Is Not Susan" (Breakthrough Mix) — 7:45 	
 "My Name Is Not Susan" (Album Edit) —	4:37

 Germany, CD maxi-single (The Remixes) "My Name Is Not Susan" (Waddell Alternate Mix) — 7:40 	
 "My Name Is Not Susan" (L.A. Reid & Babyface Remix) — 5:56 	
 "My Name Is Not Susan" (Waddell Straight Mix) — 6:17 	

 US, CD maxi-single promo "My Name Is Not Susan" (Album Edit) — 4:37  	   	
 "My Name Is Not Susan" (U.K. Mix) — 4:10
 "My Name Is Not Susan" (Power Radio Mix w/ Rap) — 4:39
 "My Name Is Not Susan" (Power Radio Mix w/o Rap) — 4:04

 UK, Germany, CD maxi-single "My Name Is Not Susan" (Waddell 7") — 4:08   	   	
 "My Name Is Not Susan" ('70's Flange Mix) — 5:34
 "My Name Is Not Susan" (Logic Remix Extended) — 5:39
 "My Name Is Not Susan" (Ambiente Mix) — 5:08

 US, 12" vinylA1: "My Name Is Not Susan" (Extended Mix) — 5:56 	
A2: "My Name Is Not Susan" (Dub) — 4:28 	
B1: "My Name Is Not Susan" (Extended U.K. Mix) — 6:16 	
B2: "My Name Is Not Susan" (Alternate U.K. Mix) — 7:40

 Germany, 12" vinyl maxi-singleA1: "My Name Is Not Susan" (Waddell Straight Mix) — 6:17 	
A2: "My Name Is Not Susan" (Waddell Alternate Mix) — 7:40 	
B1: "My Name Is Not Susan" (L.A. Reid & Babyface Remix) — 5:56 	
B2: "My Name Is Not Susan" (Instrumental Edit) — 5:19 	
B3: "My Name Is Not Susan" (Dub) — 4:28

 UK, 12" vinylA: "My Name Is Not Susan" (The Breakthrough Mix)   	   	
B1: "My Name Is Not Susan" (The Upbeat Cut Mix) 		
B2: "My Name Is Not Susan" (Waddell 7" Mix)

 Australia, 12" vinyl maxi-single'
A1: "My Name Is Not Susan" (Logic Remix Extended)   	   	
A2: "My Name Is Not Susan" ('70's Flange Mix) 		
B1: "My Name Is Not Susan" (Album Edit) 		
B2: "My Name Is Not Susan" (Ambiente Mix)

Notes
"Logic Remix" is named the "Bellydance Mix" on some vinyl releases."Waddell Straight Mix", "Extended U.K. Mix" and "The Upbeat Cut Mix" are the same mix with alternate names."Waddell Alternate Mix" , "Breakthrough Mix" and "Alternate U.K. Mix" are the same mix.

Credits and personnel 
Vocal Arrangement: L.A. Reid, Babyface and Whitney Houston
Background Vocals: Whitney Houston
Donald Parks: Keyboard Programming
Kayo: Bass
Rhythm Arrangement: L.A. Reid and Babyface
Additional Production and Remix: John Waddell 
Babyface: Keyboards
L.A. Reid: Drums and Percussion

Recording and mixing
Recorded at Elumba Recording, Los Angeles, CA
Mixed at Studio LaCoCo, Atlanta, GA

Charts

Weekly charts

Year-end charts

References

External links 
My Name Is Not Susan at Discogs

1991 singles
Whitney Houston songs
New jack swing songs
1990 songs
Arista Records singles
Song recordings produced by Babyface (musician)
Songs written by Eric Foster White